Tom Mueller (born c. 1945) is a former American football coach.  He served as the head football coach at the University of Nebraska Omaha from 1990 to 1993, compiling a record of 12–31.  A native of Elkader, Iowa, Mueller played college football as a defensive back at Upper Iowa University.  He coached high school football in Iowa and was the defensive coordinator at Morningside College from 1981 to 1982, before coming to Nebraska–Omaha as an assistant in 1983.

Head coaching record

College

References

Year of birth missing (living people)
1940s births
Living people
American football defensive backs
Upper Iowa Peacocks football players
Morningside Mustangs football coaches
Nebraska–Omaha Mavericks football coaches
High school football coaches in Iowa
People from Elkader, Iowa
Players of American football from Iowa